The politics of Guizhou Province in the People's Republic of China is structured in a dual party-government system like all other governing institutions in mainland China.

The Governor of Guizhou is the highest-ranking official in the People's Government of Guizhou. However, in the province's dual party-government governing system, the Governor has less power than the Guizhou Chinese Communist Party (CCP) Provincial Committee Secretary, colloquially termed the "Guizhou CCP Party Chief".

List of provincial-level leaders

CCP Guizhou Committee Secretaries
Su Zhenhua: 1949–1954
Zhou Lin: 1954–1964
Li Dazhang: 1964–1965
Jia Qiyun: 1965–1967
Li Zaihe: 1967–1969
Lan Yinong: 1969–1973
Lu Ruilin: 1973–1977
Ma Li (马力): 1977–1979
Chi Biqing: 1979–1985
Zhu Houze: 1985
Hu Jintao: 1985–1988
Liu Zhengwei: 1988–1993
Liu Fangren: 1993–2001
Qian Yunlu: 2001–2005
Shi Zongyuan: 2005–2010
Li Zhanshu: 2010–2012
Zhao Kezhi: 2012–2015
Chen Min'er: 2015–2017
Sun Zhigang: 2017–2020
Shen Yiqin: 2020–2022
Xu Lin: 2022–present

Chairpersons of Guizhou People's Congress
Xu Jiansheng (徐健生): 1980–1983
Wu Shi (吴实): 1983–1985
Zhang Yuhuan (张玉环): 1985–1993
Liu Zhengwei (刘正威): January 1993–July 1993
Liu Yulin (刘玉林): July 1993 – January 1994
Wang Chaowen (王朝文): 1994–1998
Liu Fangren (刘方仁): January 1998 – November 2002
Qian Yunlu (钱运录): January 2003 – December 2005
Shi Zongyuan (石宗源): January 2006 – 2010
Li Zhanshu: 2010–2012
Zhao Kezhi: 2012–2015
Chen Min'er: 2015–2017
Sun Zhigang: 2017–2021
Shen Yiqin: 2021–2022
Xu Lin: 2022–present

Governors
Yang Yong (杨勇): 1949–1954
Zhou Lin (周林): 1955–1965
Li Li (李立): 1965–1967
Li Zaihe (李再合): 1967–1971
Lan Yinong (蓝亦农): 1971–1973
Lu Ruilin (鲁瑞林): 1973–1977
Ma Li (马力): 1977–1979
Su Gang (苏钢): 1980–1983
Wang Zhaowen (王朝文): 1983–1993
Chen Shineng (陈士能): 1993–1996
Wu Yixia (吴亦侠): 1996–1998
Qian Yunlu (钱运录): 1998–2001
Shi Xiushi (石秀诗): 2001–2006
Lin Shusen (林树森): 2006–2010
Zhao Kezhi: 2010–2012
Chen Min'er: 2012–2015
Sun Zhigang: 2015–2017
Shen Yiqin: 2017–2020
Li Bingjun: 2020–present

Chairpersons of CPPCC Guizhou Committee 
Shen Yunpu (申云浦): 1955–1956
Xu Jiansheng (徐健生): 1956–1959
Miao Chunting (苗春亭): 1959–1967
Li Baohua (李葆华): 1977–1979
Chi Biqing (池必卿): 1979–1980
Miao Chunting (苗春亭): 1980–1993
Long Zhiyi (龙志毅): 1993–1998
Wang Siqi (王思齐): 1998–2006
Sun Gan (孙淦): 2006–2007
Huang Yao (黄瑶): 2007–2010
Wang Zhengfu (王正福): 2010–2013
Wang Fuyu (王富玉): 2013–2018
Liu Xiaokai (刘晓凯): 2018–present

Guizhou
Guizhou